Donald Joseph Betourne (February 27, 1915 – March 18, 2002) was an American professional basketball player and head coach. He played in the National Basketball League for the Kankakee Gallagher Trojans during the 1937–38 season. Betourne served as a player-coach for the Trojans (the only year the team existed). He played at St. Viator College prior to his time in the NBL.

References

1915 births
2002 deaths
American men's basketball players
Basketball coaches from Illinois
Basketball players from Illinois
Forwards (basketball)
Kankakee Gallagher Trojans coaches
Kankakee Gallagher Trojans players
People from Bourbonnais, Illinois
Player-coaches
Sportspeople from the Chicago metropolitan area
St. Viator Irish basketball players